Released in 2010, D.N.A. is a CD/DVD set of music and video collaborations between John Foxx and some of his favorite filmmakers, including Karborn, Macoto Tzeka, Ian Emes, Jonathan Barnbrook and Steve D'Augostino.

Track listing

CD 
 Maybe Tomorrow (3:58)
 Kaiyagura (4:02)
 City of Mirage (7:34)
 Flightpath Tegel (4:07)
 Violet Bloom (4:10)
 Phantom Lover (4:48)
 A Secret Life 7 (2:39)
 A Secret Life 2 (9:37)
 Over the Mirage (4:56)

All tracks written by John Foxx except Violet Bloom written by D'Agostino & Foxx, A Secret Life 7 and A Secret Life 2 written by D'Agostino, Foxx & Jansen, and Over the Mirage written by Budd, Foxx & Garcia.

DVD 

 Maybe Tomorrow (by Karborn)
 Violet Bloom (by Steve D'Augustino)
 Flightpath Tegel (by Ian Emes)
 A Secret Life 2 (by Ian Emes)
 City of Mirage (by Macoto Tezka)
 Kaiyagura (by Macoto Tezka)
 Over the Mirage (by Macoto Tezka)
 A Half-Remembered Sentence from The Quiet Man (by Jonathan Barnbrook)
 Clicktrack (by Jonathan Barnbrook)

Personnel
 John Foxx
 Steve D'Augostino
 Karborn
 Macoto Tzeka
 Jonathan Barnbrook
 Ian Emes

References

John Foxx albums
2010 albums